Hauschka is the alias of Düsseldorf-based pianist and composer Volker Bertelmann.

Hauschka may also refer to:

People
 Rudolf Hauschka (1891–1969), an Austrian chemist, author, inventor, entrepreneur, anthroposophist and namesake of the Dr. Hauschka brand of skin care and cosmetic products
 Stephen Hauschka (born 1985), an American football player

Companies
Dr. Hauschka, German beauty brand

Slavic-language surnames
German-language surnames